The Micanopy Historic District is a U.S. historic district (designated as such on January 28, 1983) located in Micanopy, Florida. It contains 35 historic buildings.

Gallery

Churches

Houses

See also

Church of the Mediator (Micanopy, Florida)

References

External links
 Florida's Office of Cultural and Historical Programs - Alachua County
 Historic Markers in Alachua County

National Register of Historic Places in Alachua County, Florida
Historic districts on the National Register of Historic Places in Florida